The Oral Roberts Golden Eagles are the sixteen intercollegiate athletic teams that represent Oral Roberts University, located in Tulsa, Oklahoma.  The Golden Eagles compete at the National Collegiate Athletic Association (NCAA) Division I level as a member of the Summit League, which it officially joined on July 1, 2014.

History
The Titans began play as an independent team in 1965. In 1971, the Titans moved up to Division I. From 1979 until 1987, the Titans were a member of the Midwestern Collegiate Conference. In 1989, they became an NAIA school. In 1991, they returned to Division I. The team joined the Mid-Continent Conference (now The Summit League) effective 1997. In 2012, the school joined the Southland Conference.  In December 2013, ORU announced that it would return to the Summit League for all sports in 2014.

As of 2009, ORU has had 22 players selected in the NBA draft, and 28 baseball All-Americans. Andretti Bain, who won a silver medal for The Bahamas as part of its 4 x 400 metres relay team at the 2008 Summer Olympics, also attended ORU.

Sports sponsored

A member of the Summit League, Oral Roberts University sponsors teams in eight men's and eight women's NCAA sanctioned sports:

Men's basketball

The men's basketball team reached the NCAA Elite Eight in the 1974 Tournament before losing to Kansas 90–93 in overtime, in what has been called "the most important basketball game ever played in Tulsa." Most recently, the men's basketball team went to the 2021 NCAA tournament as the #15 seed, advancing as a cinderella to the Sweet 16, losing to #3 seeded Arkansas, 70–72.

In the 2006–07 season, on November 15, 2006, the unranked Oral Roberts basketball team stunned the #3 team in the nation, the University of Kansas, at the Allen Fieldhouse in Lawrence, Kansas, 78–71. The team went on to win the Mid-Con conference championship on March 6, 2007, defeating #2 seeded Oakland, overcoming an 11-point halftime deficit to win 71–67.

In 2008, the Golden Eagles captured their third consecutive Summit League title, receiving a 13 seed in the South Region of the NCAA tournament. The Golden Eagles lost to 4th-seeded Pittsburgh, 63–82.

Overview of team achievement
 Overall Record of 907-641 (.586)
 Six NCAA Tournament appearances
 Eight NIT appearances
 17 total postseason tournament appearances
 Six Summit League Regular Season Titles
 Four Summit League Tournament Titles 
 Five Summit League Players of the Year
 Two Summit League Defensive Player of the Year
 Five Summit League Newcomers of the Year
 Three Summit League Sixth Men of the Year
 2021 victories versus No. 2 Ohio State (72-75) and No. 7 Florida (78-81)
 2009 victories over Stanford, Missouri and No. 13 New Mexico
 2007 victory over Oklahoma State
 2006 victory at No. 3 Kansas
 1999 victory over Tulsa's Elite team
 21 First Team All-Summit League selections
 Nine Second Team All-Summit League selections
 15 Summit League All-Newcomer selections
 14 Summit League All-Tournament selections
 Four Mid-Con Championship game appearances
 Three First Team All-Americans
 Two Second Team All-Americans
 Two Third Team All-Americans
 12 Honorable Mention All-Americans

Coaching staff
The Golden Eagles are currently coached by Paul Mills, who took over the program prior to the 2017-18 season.

Mills took over for Scott Sutton, who was the all-time winningest coach in ORU history with 328 wins (328-247) in 18 seasons.
__

Coaching Career Records
Coach Tenure Yrs. Record Pct.
Bill White 1965–69 5 65–35 .650
Ken Trickey 1969–74, 87–93 11 214–116 .648
Jerry Hale 1974–77 3 61–21 .744
Lake Kelly 1977–79 2 30–24 .556
Ken Hayes 1979–83 4 50–43 .538
Dick Acres 1982–85 3 47–34 .580
Ted Owens 1985–87 2 21–35 .375
Bill Self 1993–97 4 55–54 .505
Barry Hinson 1997–99 2 36–23 .610
Scott Sutton 1999–2017 18 328-247 .570
Paul Mills 2017–pres

Baseball
The ORU baseball team has won the Mid-Con and Summit League tournament titles in 18 of the last 20 years, with the only exceptions being the 2013 and 2014 seasons in which ORU competed in the Southland Conference. In 2006, they advanced to the NCAA Super Regional.
ORU continues to compete against regional rivals such as Arkansas, Oklahoma, Oklahoma State, Texas, and Wichita State, as well as dominating the Summit League.

Notable players
Mike Moore was an ORU standout from 1979–81 and first-round draft pick. He played 14 seasons in the big leagues and was selected an American League All-Star in 1989. He played in consecutive World Series with Oakland (1989–90), winning a World Championship in 1989. Todd Burns (1982–84) was Moore's teammate in Oakland and helped the A's win three straight American League pennants (1988–90) and 1989 World Series. Keith Lockhart (1985–86) played in the 1999 World Series as a member of the Atlanta Braves and helped that team win five consecutive National League Eastern Division titles. Tom Nieto (1981) played in the 1985 world Series with St. Louis Cardinals and won a World championship in 1987 as a member of the Minnesota Twins. Doug Bernier, Michael Hollimon and Steve Holm all made their Major League debuts in 2008. Alex "Chi Chi" Gonzalez was drafted in the 1st round (23rd overall) in 2013 and made it to the Rangers lineup for his MLB debut May 30, 2015. Jose Trevino (6th round, 2014) and Matt Whatley (3rd round, 2017) were also drafted by the Texas Rangers.

Notable coaches
Former head coach Larry Cochell guided ORU from 1977–86, leading the school to seven NCAA Regional appearances and the 1978 College World Series.  Former coach Sunny Golloway was one of the winningest active skippers in the NCAA Division I, guiding the Golden Eagles to a 294–136 record and five NCAA Regional appearances in seven years at the helm. He was an assistant coach for Team USA in the summer of 2002.

As first year head coach in 2004, Rob Walton guided ORU to the nation's best winning percentage (.820) while also setting a Summit League mark with a 50–11 overall record. The 2004 Golden Eagles were ranked in the Top 20 for 12 consecutive weeks, reaching a high of No. 13 in late May...Walton led ORU to its ninth consecutive Summit League Tournament title and the program's 18th NCAA Regional appearance in 2006. Walton also earned ABCA Midwest Region Coach of the Year honors after guiding the Golden Eagles to a regional championship and final Top 25 ranking in all three major, a program first. Walton also served as the head coach for USA Baseball's National Team during the summer of 2008.

Since taking over for Walton in 2013, Ryan Folmar led ORU to a 132-93 record and three NCAA Tournament berths in his first five years. In 2017, the Golden Eagles were 43-16 (25-4 Summit League) and beat Oklahoma State in the second game of the Fayetteville Regional in the NCAA Tournament.

NCAA First-Team All-Americans Selections
1977 Bob Volk
1978 Bill Springman
1981 Mike Moore
1981 Tom Nieto
1982 Keith Mucha
1984 Todd Burns
1991 Robert Collins
1999 Jeff Stallings
2004 Dennis Bigley
2008 Brian Van Kirk

Women's basketball
Having 4 conference championships under their belt in the 8 years since joining the Mid-Continent Conference (now The Summit League), the team has a solid reputation among fellow mid-major programs.  Head coach Jerry Finkbeiner was hired in July 1996 and has delivered all four of the school's NCAA Women's Division I Basketball Championship appearances.
 Overall record of 219–172 (.5607)
 Five NCAA tournament appearances
 One WNIT appearance
 One Summit League regular season title
 Five Summit League tournament titles
 Two Preseason WNIT appearances
 Five Summit League Players of the Year
 Five Summit League Newcomers of the Year
 Five Summit League Defensive Player of the year
 11 first team All-Summit League selections
 Eight Second Team All-Summit League selections
 10 Summit League All-Newcomer Team selections
 Six Summit League Tournament MVPs 
 Seven Summit League Championship game appearances 
 Two Honorable Mention All-American
 One Freshman All-American

Women's soccer
The women's soccer team advanced to the NCAA Tournament in 2004.
 Overall record of 134–99–17 (.570)
 One NCAA Tournament appearance
 Two Summit League Regular Tournament titles
 Three Summit League Players of the Year
 30 First Team All- Summit League selections
 20 Second Team All-Summit League selections
 22 Summit League All-Tournament selections
 Two Summit League Tournament MVPs
 Six Summit League Championship game appearances
Memorable Players: Nicole Bucelluni, Tayah Schroter-Gillespie, Lindsay Ruisch, Michelle Hoogveld, Kellie Fenton

Men's soccer
 One NCAA Play-in appearance 
 One Summit League Tournament Title
 Three Summit League players of the year
 Three Summit League Newcomers of the Year
 25 First Team All-Summit League selections
 25 Second Team All-Summit League selections
 16 Summit League All-Tournament selections
 One Summit League Tournament MVP

Women's golf
 13 Summit League titles (consecutive)
 NCAA's Longest Active Consecutive Conference Championships Streak
 10 NCAA Tournament appearances
 One individual NCAA Championships qualifier
 10 Summit League Players of the Year
 Nine Summit League Newcomers of the Year
 42 First Team All-Summit League selections
 16 Second Team All-Summit League selections

Men's golf
 Six NCAA Championship appearances
 Best finish: Second in 1981 to BYU
 13 conference championships
Horizon League (6): 1980–83, 1984 (fall), 1985
Summit League (7): 1998–2001, 2003, 2009–10
 Six Summit League Players of the Year
 Eight Summit League Newcomers of the Year
 Three NCAA qualifiers
 17 First Team All-Summit League selections
 13 Second Team All-Summit League selections
 PGA Tour winners: Dave Barr (two wins), Bill Glasson (seven wins)
 Paul Friedlander, a Swazi golfer, played for the team and became a professional golfer

Men's and women's cross country
 Five Women's NCAA Regional appearances
 Two Summit League Men's Runner of the Year
 Four Summit League Women's runner of the Year
 One Summit League Women's Newcomer of the Year
 Ben Houltberg, 2000 Mid-Con Student-Athlete of the year
 Faithy Kamangila, 2004 Cross Country All-American
 Nine Men's First Team All-Summit League selections
 Six Men's Second Team All-Summit League selections
 16 Women's First Team All-Summit League selections
 Eight Women's Second Team All-Summit League selections

Men's indoor track & field
 One individual Nation Champion
 Seven Sumit League Championships
 20 NCAA Qualifiers
 Nine All-Americans 
 Eight Summit League Newcomers of the Year
 Eight Summit League Athletes of the Year
 149 All Summit selections
 Seven All-Summit Championship Event-Records

Men's outdoor track & field
 Two individual National Champions
 Six All-Americans
 One Summit League Championship
 40 NCAA qualifiers
 One Summit League Athlete of the Year
 Two Summit League Newcomer of the Year
 2006 4x800 Relay Team Ranked #1 in the World
 Ranked #10 nationally in 2002 with a 3.03 GPA 
 122 All-Summit League selections
 Four Summit League Championship event-records

Women's indoor track & field
 Two Summit League Championships
 40 NCAA Qualifiers
 Seven All-Americans
 Ranked #1 nationally in 2001 & 2002 in team G.P.A.
 115 All-Summit League selections
 13 Summite League Championship event-records
 Six Athletes of the Year
 Three Newcomer of the Year

Women's tennis
 Seven NCAA appearances
 Seven Summit League Regular Season titles
 Eight Summit League Tournament + Championships
 Five Summit League Players of the Year
 Three Summit League Newcomers of the Year
 33 All-Summit League selections

Men's tennis
 Eight NCAA Tournament appearances
 Seven Summit League Regular Season titles
 Nine Summit League Tournament Championships
 Five Summit League Players of the Year
 Three Summit League Newcomer of the Year
 36 All-Summit League selections

Volleyball
 Overall record of 259–135 (.657)
 Seven Summit League Player of the Year
 Three Summit League Newcomers of the Year
 Six Summit League Setters of the Year
 Three Summit League Defensive Players of the Year
 Seven Summit League Regular Season titles
 Seven Summit League Tournament titles
 Seven NCAA Tournament appearances
 1997 NCAA Tournament win over #10 Arizona
 Seven Summit League Tournament MVPs
 26 First Team All-Summit League selections
 18 Second Team All-Summit League selections
 155–31 overall record in Summit League Regular Season play
 Julianna Moser, 1999 and 2000 Summit League Female Student-Athlete of the Year

Mascot
ORU's athletic teams for both men and women are known as the Golden Eagles, a change which became effective on April 30, 1993.

Originally, ORU's nicknames were the Titans for men and the Lady Titans for women. These monikers were adopted in 1965 by a vote of the student body, many of whom were from the East Coast or were either casual or serious New York Titans (now known as Jets) football fans.

The nicknames endured until 1993, when a search for a new nickname was concluded with the selection of the Golden Eagles. ORU's new mascot, "Eli" the Golden Eagle, hatched out of his papier-mache egg on November 17, 1993, before the start of an exhibition basketball game. With this unveiling, the Golden Eagle nickname became the official symbol of a new era in ORU athletics.

Venues
The Golden Eagles basketball teams play at the Mabee Center. The baseball team plays at J. L. Johnson Stadium. The volleyball team plays at Cooper Aerobics Center. The soccer teams play at the ORU Soccer Complex. The golf teams play at Indian Springs Country Club.

Mabee Center

The Mabee Center, an outstanding collegiate arena, has been home to the Golden Eagles 1972.
Mabee Center was built as an elliptical cable-suspension structure with basketball in mind. The arena has 10,575 permanent theater seats – with no obstacles to clear viewing. The splendid viewing and playing areas have drawn nine different national tournaments since the building opened. The Golden Eagles themselves played in the first NCAA tournament held here in 1974. Four other NCAA regionals (1975, 1978, 1982 and 1985) have been based at the Mabee Center. The National Invitation Tournament picked ORU as host four times (1977, 1980, 1982 and 1983).

J. L. Johnson Stadium

J. L. Johnson Stadium has been the home of Golden Eagles baseball since 1978.  It hosted its first game on March 6, 1978.

In 2008, a  facility was added which includes coaches offices, a state-of-the-art weight room and the Grand Slam Room in which boosters and fans can watch ORU games in a climate-controlled environment. The facility is located down the right-field line.

Johnson Stadium has been host to three NCAA Regionals (1978,1980,1981), 14 conference tournaments, and many All-Americans.  Many Major Leaguers have played at Johnson Stadium, including Roger Clemens, Joe Carter, Kirk Gibson, Tony Gwynn, Keith Lockhart, Pete Incaviglia, Kevin McReynolds, Mike Moore, and Robin Ventura.

H. A. Chapman Indoor Practice Facility

The H. A. Chapman Indoor Practice Facility opened in the Fall of 2009. The  facility, located just west of J. L. Johnson Stadium, features indoor practices areas for both baseball and track & field programs. Built at a cost of $1.2 million, the facility was funded exclusively through private donations, including a generous lead gift from the H. A. and Mary K. Chapman Charitable Trust. The baseball portion of the facility features a regulation-sized infield, three pitching areas and three netted batting cages. The track & field area features a complete pole vault area, high jump pit and long jump & triple jump practice areas.

References

External links